Eiffel Peak is a  mountain summit in Banff National Park in Alberta, Canada. It's part of the Bow Range, which is a sub-range of the Canadian Rockies. The nearest higher peak is Mount Temple,  to the northeast.

History

The first ascent was made in 1901 by Charles S. Thompson and G.M. Weed, with Hans Kaufmann as guide.

The peak was named in 1908 by Arthur O. Wheeler on account of its great height; its name is an allusion to the Eiffel Tower.

The mountain's name was made official in 1952 by the Geographical Names Board of Canada.

Geology

Eiffel Peak is composed of sedimentary rock laid down during the Precambrian to Jurassic periods. Formed in shallow seas, this sedimentary rock was pushed east and over the top of younger rock during the Laramide orogeny.

Climate

Based on the Köppen climate classification, Eiffel Peak is located in a subarctic climate with cold, snowy winters, and mild summers.

See also 

 Mountains of Alberta
 Geography of Alberta

Further reading
 Alan Kane, Scrambles in the Canadian Rockies, PP 316–317
  Brian Patton, Bart Robinson, Canadian Rockies Trail Guide, P 101

References

External links
 
 Parks Canada web site: Banff National Park
 Eiffel Peak weather: Mountain Forecast

Three-thousanders of Alberta
Alberta's Rockies